Gleichenia squamulosa known locally as yerba loza, palmita and huadahue, is a fern endemic to Chile with a natural distribution ranging from Maule Region (~35° S) in the north to Aysén Region (~47° S) in the south including the Juan Fernández Islands. It is found from sea level up to 1500 m.a.s.l. and occurs in humid areas that are not too shady.

References

 Florachilena.cl

squamulosa
Ferns of Chile
Flora of the Juan Fernández Islands